Adenylyl cyclase type 9 is an enzyme that in humans is encoded by the ADCY9 gene.

Function 

Adenylyl cyclase is a membrane bound enzyme that catalyses the formation of cyclic AMP from ATP. It is regulated by a family of G protein-coupled receptors, protein kinases, and calcium. The type 9 adenylyl cyclase is a widely distributed adenylyl cyclase, and it is stimulated by beta-adrenergic receptor activation but is insensitive to forskolin, calcium, and somatostatin.

References

External links

Further reading

Biology of bipolar disorder
EC 4.6.1